James Branch is a  long tributary to Records Pond (Broad Creek) that rises in northern Wicomico County, Maryland and flows north into Sussex County, Delaware.  James Branch is listed as a state-protected paddling trail by Delaware.

See also
List of Delaware rivers
List of rivers of Maryland

References

External links
James Branch Nature Preserve

Rivers of Delaware
Rivers of Maryland
Rivers of Sussex County, Delaware
Rivers of Wicomico County, Maryland